David A. Hamil (December 3, 1908 – July 27, 2002) was an American politician who served in the Colorado House of Representatives from the Logan district from 1939 to 1949 and from 1951 to 1956. He served as Speaker of the Colorado House of Representatives from 1951 to 1956.

References

1908 births
2002 deaths
Speakers of the Colorado House of Representatives
Republican Party members of the Colorado House of Representatives
20th-century American politicians